Stygioides ivinskisi is a species of moth of the family Cossidae. It is found in Lebanon.

References

Moths described in 2007
Cossinae